A two-hander is a term for a play, film, or television programme with only two main characters. The two characters in question often display differences in social standing or experiences, differences that are explored and possibly overcome as the story unfolds.  Instances of two-handers may include theatre, film, television episodes, television series, and radio.

Theatre 

 The Stronger (1889) by August Strindberg  (also dramatic monologue)
 Pariah (1889) by August Strindberg
 Hughie (1942) by Eugene O'Neill
 The Fourposter (1951) by Jan de Hartog
 Two for the Seesaw (1958) by William Gibson
 The Zoo Story (1959) by Edward Albee
 The Dumb Waiter (1960) by Harold Pinter
 Happy Days (1961) by Samuel Beckett
 The Blood Knot (1961) by Athol Fugard
 Dutchman (1966) by LeRoi Jones
 I Do! I Do! (1966) by Tom Jones
 Same Time, Next Year (1975) by Bernard Slade
 The Gin Game (1976) by Donald L. Coburn
 The Woods (1977) by David Mamet
 Talley's Folly (1980) by Lanford Wilson
 Duet for One (1980, filmed in 1986) by Tom Kempinski
 Educating Rita (1980) by Willy Russell
 Mass Appeal (1980) by Bill C. Davis
 'night, Mother (1982) by Marsha Norman
 Some Men Need Help (1982) by John Ford Noonan
 The Woman in Black (1987) by Stephen Mallatratt
 The Meeting (1987) by Jeff Stetson
 Love Letters (1988) by A. R. Gurney
 Frankie and Johnny in the Clair de Lune (1987) by Terrence McNally
 A Walk in the Woods (1988) by Lee Blessing
 The Secret of Sherlock Holmes (1988) by Jeremy Paul
 Oleanna (1992) by David Mamet
 Lonely Planet (1993) by Steven Dietz
 John & Jen (1995) by Andrew Lippa and Tom Greenwald
 Same Time, Another Year (1995) by Bernard Slade (sequel)
 Disco Pigs (1996) by Enda Walsh
 Stones in His Pockets (1996) by Marie Jones
 Vigil (1996) by Morris Panych
 The Blue Room (1998) by David Hare
 Freud's Last Session (1999) by Mark St. Germain
 Vincent River (2000) by Philip Ridley
 Six Dance Lessons in Six Weeks (2001) by Richard Alfieri
 The Last Five Years (2001) by Jason Robert Brown
 Topdog/Underdog (2001) by Suzan-Lori Parks
 A Number (2002) by Caryl Churchill
 Adrenalin...Heart (2002) by Georgia Fitch
 Tuesdays with Morrie (2002) by Mitch Albom and Jeffrey Hatcher
 Matt & Ben (2002) by Mindy Kaling and Brenda Withers
 The Sunset Limited (2006) by Cormac McCarthy
 The Story of My Life (2009) by Neil Bartram and Brian Hill
 A Steady Rain (2007) by Keith Huff
 It Felt Empty When The Heart Went At First But It Is Alright Now (2009) by Lucy Kirkwood
 The Mountaintop (2009) by Katori Hall
 Red (2009) by John Logan
 Venus in Fur (2010) by David Ives
 Lungs (2011) by Duncan Macmillan
 In a Forest, Dark and Deep (2011) by Neil LaBute
 Tender Napalm (2011) by Philip Ridley
 Constellations (2012) by Nick Payne
 Between the Sheets (2012) by Jordi Mand
 The Anarchist (2012) by David Mamet
 The Velocity of Autumn (2013) by Eric Coble
Sex With Strangers (2014) by Laura Eason
 China Doll (2015) by David Mamet
 Guards at the Taj (2015) by Rajiv Joseph
 A Case for the Existence of God (2022) by Samuel D. Hunter

Opera  
 Love Counts 2005 by Michael Nyman and Michael Hastings

Film 

 Heaven Knows, Mr Allison (1957) by John Huston
 Dutchman (1966) by Anthony Harvey
 Hell in the Pacific (1968) by John Boorman
 Sleuth (1972) by Joseph L. Mankiewicz
 Alpha Beta (1974) by Anthony Page
 Same Time, Next Year (1978) by Robert Mulligan
 My Dinner with Andre (1981) by Louis Malle
 Enemy Mine (1985) by Wolfgang Petersen
 'night, Mother (1985) by Tom Moore 
 The Caller (1987) by Arthur Allan Seidelman
 Closet Land (1991) by Radha Bharadwaj
 The Mozart Bird (1993) by Ian Kerkhof
 Oleanna (1994) by David Mamet
 Divertimento (2000) by José García Hernández
 Interview (2003) by Theo van Gogh
 Before Sunset (2004) by Richard Linklater
 Aislados (2005) by David Marqués
 In Bed (2005) by Matias Bize
 Conversations with Other Women (2005) by Hans Canosa
 Sleuth (2007) by Kenneth Branagh
 Interview (2007) by Steve Buscemi
 Moon (2009) by Duncan Jones
 Venus in Fur (2013) by Roman Polanski
 The Sunset Limited (2011) by Tommy Lee Jones
 28 Hotel Rooms (2012) by Matt Ross
 Some Velvet Morning (2013) by Neil LaBute
 Committed (2014) by Stelana Kliris
 Creep (2014) by Patrick Brice
 Blue Jay (2016) by Alex Lehmann
 The Pass (2016) by Ben A. Williams
 Love All You Have Left (2017) by Matt Sivertson
 Destination Wedding (2018) by Victor Levin
 7:20 Once a week (2018) by Matias Bize
 The Lighthouse (2019) by Robert Eggers
 The Two Popes (2019) by Fernando Meirelles
 Friend of the World (2020) by Brian Patrick Butler
 Malcolm & Marie (2021) by Sam Levinson
 Good Luck to You, Leo Grande (2022) by Sophie Hyde

Television episodes
 All in the Family: "Two's a Crowd" (Season 8, Episode 19)
 Bottom: 
 "Contest" (Series 1, Episode 3)
 "Culture" (Series 2, Episode 2)
 "Hole" (Series 3, episode 1)
Breaking Bad: "Fly" (Season 3, Episode 10)
 Brookside:
 Episode 1103 (29 May 1992)
 Episode 2432 (23 May 2001)
 Episode 2570 (19 August 2001)
 Coronation Street:
 Episode 4745a (2 January 2000)
 Episode 6519 (25 March 2007) 
 Dinner for One (1963) by Lauri Wylie, one of the most frequently repeated TV programmes ever
 Doctor Who: Heaven Sent (Series 9 episode 11)
 EastEnders two-hander episodes
 Emmerdale: 
 Episode 2754 (28 September 2000), featuring Paddy Kirk and Mandy Dingle
 Episode 3143 (28 March 2002), featuring Bernice Blackstock and Ashley Thomas
 Due to the COVID-19 pandemic causing a temporary shutdown of production, Emmerdale filmed five two-hander episodes featuring the characters during lockdown, with original storylines resuming once production restarted. These episodes aired on: 8 June 2020 (episode 8800A) featuring Sam and Lydia Dingle, 10 June 2020 (episode 8800B) featuring Cain and Aaron Dingle, 15 June 2020 (episode 8800D) featuring Vinny and Mandy Dingle, 17 June 2020 (episode 8800C) featuring Jimmy and Nicola King and 22 June 2020 (episode 8800E) featuring Chas Dingle and Paddy Kirk, .
 Fair City: Episode (19 April 2017), featuring then-married couple Paul and Niamh
 Family Guy:
 "Brian & Stewie" (Season 9, Episode 17)
 "Send in Stewie, Please" (Season 16, Episode 12)
 Four Star Playhouse: "Award" (Season 3, Episode 38)
 Home and Away: Episode 6361 (15 February 2016), featuring Ricky Sharpe and Darryl Braxton
 Mad About You: "The Conversation" (Season 6, Episode 9)
 Marvel's Agents of S.H.I.E.L.D.: "4,722 Hours" (Season 3 episode 6)
 Maude:
 "Maude's Night Out" (Season 1, Episode 22)
 "The Convention" (Season 1, Episode 14)
 Miranda: "Just Act Normal" (Series 2, Episode 5), featuring Miranda and Penny in a therapy session following an unfortunate incident involving ice cream, a policeman, a teacher and their 30 pupils
 Neighbours: 
 Episode 8052 (5 March 2019), featuring Toadfish Rebecchi and Sonya Rebecchi in which the latter dies from cancer
 Episode 8325 (23 March 2020), featuring Susan Kennedy and Finn Kelly, who chooses Susan as his next victim.
 One Foot in the Grave, series 2 episode 6, Timeless Time (15 November 1990), featuring only Victor Meldrew (Richard Wilson) and Margaret Meldrew (Annette Crosbie) trying to get to sleep in bed at night.
 Please Like Me: "Scroggin'" (Series 2, Episode 7), featuring Josh (Josh Thomas) and Rose (Debra Lawrance) hiking through the woods following the suicide of their friend. Thomas won an AACTA Award for Best Screenplay in Television for writing the episode and Lawrance won an AACTA Award for Best Performance in a Television Comedy for her portrayal of Rose. The episode also received accolades from both the Australian Writer's Guild and Australian Directors Guild.
 Porridge: "A Night In" (Series 1, Episode 3)
 The Twilight Zone: "Two" (Season 3, Episode 1), featuring Elizabeth Montgomery and Charles Bronson

Television series 

 Un gars, une fille (1997) by Guy A. Lepage
 Head Case (2007) by Alexandra Wentworth
 Web Therapy (2008) by Lisa Kudrow
 In Treatment (2008) by Rodrigo Garcia
 Roger & Val Have Just Got In (2010) by Dawn French

Radio 
 The Bickersons
 Ethel and Albert consisted mostly of two-handers.
 John Finnemore's Double Acts
 Just Molly and Me was a two-hander sequel to Fibber McGee and Molly.
 Vic and Sade began as a two-hander series and often returned to the format after a third character was added when one of the three took a day off.

References 

Drama